Huet's fulvetta (Alcippe hueti) is a species of bird in the family Alcippeidae. It is endemic to southeast China.

Its natural habitat is subtropical or tropical moist montane forest.

References

Huet's fulvetta
Birds of South China
Birds of Hainan
Huet's fulvetta